Mississippi Studios is a music venue and recording studio in Portland, Oregon's Boise neighborhood, United States. The studio opened in 2003. Jim Brunberg and Kevin Cradock are owners. The venue was formerly a Baptist church, but has since been completely rebuilt and enlarged, partially using materials from the church.

See also
 Revolution Hall

References

External links

 

2003 establishments in Oregon
American companies established in 2003
Boise, Portland, Oregon
Music venues in Portland, Oregon
North Portland, Oregon
Recording studios in the United States